The 2004 K League was the 22nd season of the K League. The previous single format of the league was replaced by two regular stages and playoffs in this season. Each team played a total of 12 matches against every other team in each stage. After both stages were finished, two winners and the top two clubs in the overall table qualified for the playoffs.

Regular season

First stage
The first place team qualify for the championship playoffs.

Second stage
The first place team qualified for the championship playoffs.

Overall table
The top two teams in the overall table qualified for the championship playoffs.

Championship playoffs

Bracket

Final table

Top scorers
This list includes goals of the championship playoffs. The official top goalscorer was decided with records of only regular season.

Awards

Main awards

Best XI

Source:

See also
 2004 K League Championship
 2004 Korean League Cup
 2004 Korean FA Cup

References

External links
 RSSSF

K League seasons
1
South Korea
South Korea